Maris Stella High School (MSHS)  is a government-aided, all-boys Catholic secondary school with autonomous status. As a full school, it comprises a primary section offering a six-year programme leading up to the Primary School Leaving Examination, as well as a secondary section offering a four-year programme leading up to the Singapore-Cambridge GCE Ordinary Level examinations. Run by the international Marist Brothers at Mount Vernon Road, Singapore near Bartley MRT station, Maris Stella High School is one of the eleven Special Assistance Plan (SAP) high schools in Singapore.

History

Founding 
Maris Stella High School was founded in 1958 by the international Marist Brothers to ease overwhelming applications for admission to Catholic High School. The school begun operations with eleven teachers, running a primary section of 163 students and a secondary section of 124 students. Academic lessons took place in the afternoon at St. Stephen's School in Siglap.

As enrollment rose, other schools were approached for assistance in lesson grounds. Between 1963 and 1966, Maris Stella High School functioned concurrently at different premises. Among them were Silat Road Government Integrated Primary School, St. Patrick's School, Opera Estate Convent, Tung Ling English School, and Jalan Kembangan Integrated Primary School. Numerous issues plagued the institution, both in administration as well as in conducting lessons, as the premises used were miles apart. The school also ran pre-university classes between 1964 and 1975.

Mount Vernon campus 
On 22 October 1966, Maris Stella High School moved into a permanent campus at Mount Vernon Road. The campus was built with fifteen classrooms and a four-storey science block. A grand celebration was held to mark the official opening of the new school. In 1969, the second phrase of the campus development was completed, consisting of an administrative block and a 1600-seat auditorium. In total, these two phases of development cost over S$1.3 million.

In 1974, the development project for the expansion of the campus was launched. The new five-storey building for the primary section was completed by the end of October 1975, at a cost of about $1.1 million. The new building was officially declared open on 11 September 1976.

A separate 3.11 hectares site for the primary section was acquired in 1982, which was adjacent to the present school building. A designated three-storey school building was built and opened in 1987, and that year, in order to cope with its large student population, the primary and secondary sections were split into independently functioning entities.

Attainment of SAP status 
By the late 1970s, the Straits Times reported that the school's academic performance was good, having a pass rate of at least 97% in the Primary School Leaving Examination, and a mean pass rate of 90% in the GCE Ordinary Levels. The school was also one of the few Chinese-medium schools in Singapore at that time not facing falling primary enrolment.

In 1978, the school was selected as one of the initial list of Special Assistance Plan schools. The first batch of nine schools, including Maris Stella High, welcomed its first full cohort of Special Stream students in 1979. That same year, the school introduced instruction in English for several subjects. In line with the Ministry of Education's bilingualism policy of the late 1970s, the school introduced English-speaking days and requested students to speak English during assemblies.

Autonomous status and the new millennium 
In 1996, Maris Stella High became an autonomous school, the additional funds providing extra programmes and facilities. From 1995 to 1997, the school moved to a temporary site at Mount Vernon Secondary School while the school was rebuilt.

In 2002, Maris Stella High was designated as a Cluster Centre of Excellence for Information and Communication Technology (ICT).

Principal

Academic information

GCE O Level Express Course 
As a non-Integrated Programme Special Assistance Plan school, Maris Stella High School offers four-year Special (Express) course. The Express Course is a nationwide four-year programme that leads up to the Singapore-Cambridge GCE Ordinary Level examination.

Academic subjects 
The examinable academic subjects for Singapore-Cambridge GCE Ordinary Level offered by Maris Stella High School for upper secondary level (via. streaming in secondary 2), as of 2017, are listed below.

Notes:
 Subjects indicated with ' * ' are mandatory subjects.
 All students in Singapore are required to undertake a Mother Tongue Language as an examinable subject, as indicated by ' ^ '.
 "SPA" in Pure Science subjects refers to the incorporation of School-based Science Practical Assessment, which 20% of the subject result in the national examination are determined by school-based practical examinations, supervised by the Singapore Examinations and Assessment Board. The SPA Assessment has been replaced by one Practical Assessment in the 2018 O Levels.

Notable alumni
 Lee Yi Shyan: Senior Minister of State, Ministry of Trade and Industry & Ministry of National Development, Member of Parliament for East Coast GRC
 Ong Ye Kung: Minister of Health; Former Minister of Education; MP for Sembawang GRC, 2015
 Koh Poh Koon: MP for Ang Mo Kio GRC, 2015
 Moses Lim: Actor and comedian
 Cavin Soh: Actor and singer, Mediacorp

References

External links 
 Official website

Catholic schools in Singapore
Boys' schools in Singapore
Marist Brothers schools
Secondary schools in Singapore
Schools in Central Region, Singapore